Chris Booker (born 1971) is an American radio and TV personality.

Chris Booker may also refer to:
Christopher Booker (1937–2019), British journalist and author
Chris Booker (baseball) (born 1976), American baseball pitcher
Chris Booker (basketball) (born 1981), American basketball player